List of Chinese archaeologists 

 An Jiayao 安家瑶 (1947–)
 Cao Wei 曹玮
 Chen Mengjia 陈梦家 (1911–1966)
 Chen Tiemei 陈铁梅 (1935–2018)
 Dong Zuobin 董作賓 (1895–1963)
 Duan Qingbo 段清波 (1964–2019)
 Lixin Guo 郭立新 (1968–)
 Huang Zhanyue 黄展岳 (1926–2019)
 Huang Wenbi 黄文弼 (Huang Wen-pi) (1893–1966) 
 Jao Tsung-I 饒宗頤 (1917–2018)
 Li Feng 李峰 (1962–)
 Li Ji 李季 (1952–)
 Li Ling 李零 (1948–)
 Li Xueqin 李学勤 (Li Hsüeh-ch'in) (1933–2019)
 Liang Siyong 梁思永 (Liang Ssu-yung) (1904–1954)
 Liu E 刘鹗 (1857–1909)
 Luo Zhenyu 羅振玉 (Lo Chen-yü) (1866–1940)
 Ma Chengyuan 马承源 (1927–2004)
 Mai Yinghao 麦英豪 (1929–2016)
 Shen Kuo (沈括) (1031–1095) 
 Su Bai 宿白 (1922–2018)
 Su Bingqi 苏秉琦 (1909–1997)
 Tong Enzheng 童恩正 (1935–1997)
 Wang Tao 汪涛 (1962–)
 Wang Zhenduo 王振铎 (1911–1992)
 Wang Zhongshu 王仲殊 (1925–2015)
 Wang Ziyun 王子云 (1899–1990) 
 Xia Nai 夏鼐 (1910–1985)
 Xu Xusheng 徐旭生 (1888–1976)
 Yang Hongxun 杨鸿勋 (1931–2016)
 Yu Xingwu (于省吾) (1896–1984)
 Yuan Zhongyi 袁仲一 (1932–)
 Zeng Zhaoyu 曾昭燏 (1909–1964)
 Zhang Changshou 张长寿 (1929–2020)
 Kwang-chih Chang (K.C. Chang) 張光直 (1931–2001)
 Zhang Wenbin 张文彬 (1937–2019) 
 Zhang Zhenduo 鄭振鐸 (1898–1958)
 Zhao Kangmin 赵康民 (1936–2018)

Chinese archaeologists